The 2015–16 Bowling Green Falcons women's basketball team represents Bowling Green State University during the 2015–16 NCAA Division I women's basketball season. The Falcons, led by fourth year head coach Jennifer Roos, play their home games at the Stroh Center as members of the East Division of the Mid-American Conference. They finished the season 10–18, 6–12 in MAC play to finish in fourth place in the East Division. They lost in the first round of the MAC women's tournament to Buffalo.

Roster

Schedule
Source: 

|-
!colspan=9 style="background:#F15C26; color:white;"|  Exhibition

|-
!colspan=9 style="background:#F15C26; color:white;"| Non-conference regular season

|-
!colspan=9 style="background:#F15C26; color:white;"| MAC regular season

|-
!colspan=9 style="background:#F15C26; color:white;"| MAC Women's Tournament

See also
2015–16 Bowling Green Falcons men's basketball team

References

2015–16 Bowling Green Media Guide

Bowling Green
Bowling Green Falcons women's basketball seasons